The 2007-08 Libyan Cup was the 18th edition of the competition since its inception in 1976. 58 clubs entered this edition of the competition.

The competition ended with the Libyan Cup Final, held at the 11 June Stadium, Tripoli, on July 26, 2008. The title was contested between Khaleej Sirte and Al Madina, with Khaleej winning 1-0, Idrees Salem scoring the only goal.

Road to the Final

Round of 32

Round of 16

Quarter-finals

Semi-finals

Final

References

 
Libyan Football Cup
Cup